Delia Falconer, born in Sydney in 1966, is an Australian novelist who became famous for her bestselling novel, The Service of Clouds. She has been nominated for multiple literary awards in recognition for her work.

Biography
Falconer is an only child of two graphic designer parents. She studied for her undergraduate degree at the University of Sydney. She completed a Ph.D. in English Literature and Cultural Studies at the University of Melbourne. 

She is the author of the novels The Service of Clouds and The Lost Thoughts of Soldiers (which was republished in Australian paperback as The Lost Thoughts of Soldiers and Selected Stories). She also wrote Sydney, a personal history of her hometown for the Australian Cities series. A nonfiction work, Signs and Wonders, was published in 2021.

She frequently publishes essays, journalism, and reviews in newspapers and journals. Her stories and essays have been widely anthologized, including in The Macquarie Pen Anthology of Australian Literature.

 she was a senior lecturer in Creative Writing at the University of Technology Sydney. She has served as judge of a number of literary awards, including the Calibre Prize (2015), Stella Prize (2017), and the NSW Premier's Literary Awards (2017).

Recognition and awards
In 1998, Falconer was the recipient of the Marten Bequest Scholarship.

Falconer was described by Australian critic Peter Craven, in The Best Australian Stories 1999, as "The young Australian writer who has arguably done most to put her signature on the literature of this country". 

Falconer's books have been shortlisted for major Australian and international prizes across the fields of fiction, nonfiction, innovation, history, and biography.

In 2018, she won the Walkley-Pascall Award for Arts Criticism for "The Opposite of Glamour" which was published in the Sydney Review of Books.

Selected works

Fiction

Nonfiction

As editor
The Penguin Book of the Road, an anthology of stories of the road (Camberwell: Penguin, 2008)
The Best Australian Stories 2008 (Melbourne: Black Inc, 2008).
The Best Australian Stories 2009  (Melbourne: Black Inc, 2009).

References

External links

1966 births
Living people
Australian women novelists
Writers from New South Wales
20th-century Australian novelists
20th-century Australian women writers
Australian Book Review people